Dismorphia lysis, the dainty egg white or Lysis mimic white, is a butterfly in the family Pieridae. It is found from Ecuador to southern Peru. The habitat consists of cloud forests.

Adults have long narrow almost elliptical forewings and large hindwings. The underside is white, mottled in grey and yellow.

Subspecies
The following subspecies are recognised:
Dismorphia lysis lysis (Ecuador)
Dismorphia lysis peruana Röber, 1909 (Peru)
Dismorphia lysis mariella Lamas, 2004 (Peru)

References

Dismorphiinae
Butterflies described in 1869
Pieridae of South America
Taxa named by William Chapman Hewitson